Letharchus aliculatus is an eel in the family Ophichthidae (worm/snake eels). It was described by John E. McCosker in 1974. It is a marine, tropical eel which is known from Brazil in the southwestern Atlantic Ocean.

References

Ophichthidae
Fish described in 1974